Yusuf Olatunji, also known as Baba Legba or Baba L’Egbaa (1905 -1978), was a Nigerian Sakara drum player, who popularized the sakara music style.
He was purportedly born in 1905 or 1906 in a village called Gbegbinlawo in Ogun State in south-western Nigeria, although there are still doubts about the location of his birth. His mid-life conversion to Islam boosted his career in Yoruba music. He was born a Christian and he hailed from Iseyin in Oyo State. He was formerly known as Joseph Olatunji. He started his career in 1937 with his first record and he joined Abibu oluwa band in 1927.

He died on December 15, 1978 age 74. He is survived by 4 children and 3 wives. Olatunji was a friend of the late Lamidi Durowoju, Late Jimoh Ishola, who was later hanged in the late 80s, Late Raji Orire, Late Badejo Okunsanya and other great men. They were the rich men he mostly sang for. He also sang a lot of praise songs for some numerous prominent social clubs in Southwestern part of Nigeria. A very rich woman that goes by the name Alhaja Kuburatu Abike Adebisi known as cash Madam in Abeokuta  sent him abroad for surgery, he died 7 years later.

Discography

Yusufu Olatunji and His Group
Yekinni Tiamiyu b/w Amusa Adeoye (78; HMV [UK] J.Z. 5252)

1969
Yusufu Olatunji and His Group In Action Vol. 1 
(Philips PL 13411)(CD; Premier Music [Lagos] PLCD 007 [as Vol. 1 Bolowo Bate]) 
[A] Surakaty Eki / Jioh Gbensola / Raufu Adegbite / Egbe Ifenirepo/
[B] Bolowo Bate / Ganiyu Ladeyinde / Yekini Akintoye / Egbe Iwajowa Ijebu-Ode/Ajagbe Ejo

Yusufu Olatunji and His Group Plays Sakara Volume 2
(Philips West African PL 13413)(CD; Premier Music [Lagos] PLCD 002 [as Vol. 2 O Wole Ologo Keri])(CD; Zareco [Lagos] Z.O.N13413 [as Vol. 2 O'wole Olongo])
[A] Ajala Jinadu / Alhaji Mustafa Dabiri / Late Ramoni Alao / Yekinni Aridegbe / Egbe Irepolodun (Ibadan)
[B] Salawu Adejola / Mutairu Lemboye / Alhaji Badiru Sodunke / Badiru Amole Ajisegiri / Egbe Oredegbe (Egba)

Yusufu Olatunji and His Group Plays Sakara Volume 3 
(Philips West African PL 13414)(CD; Premier Music [Lagos] PLCD 008 [as Vol. 3 Amode Maja])(CD; Zareco [Lagos] Z.O.N13414 [as Vol. 3 Atori Kio Ma Se Weleje])
[A] Tijani Akinyele / Alimi Okerayi / Yusufu Olatunji / Sule Apena / Alhaja Raliatu Adeyemi
[B] Busari Salami (Baba-Jebba) / Abudu Amodemaja / Rafiu Amoo (Nijaiye) / Alafia Boys (Eko) / Muniratu Laro

Yusufu Olatunji and His Group In Action No. 1 
(Philips / Phonogram 6361054)(CD; Premier Music [Lagos] PLCD 016 [as Majejo Mi O Bun Mi])(CD; Zareco [Lagos] no number [as Mejejo Nio Bunmi Oba Oluwa])
[A] Sunmora Folarin / Yekinni Ajala / Tijani Aiyelokun / Orokeloni / Surakatu Amodu / Joseph Balogun
[B] A. K. Yusufu / Salu Ojelade / Lasisi Abiola / Raufu Adisa / Ayisatu Agbeke / Egbe Ajisafe

Yusufu Olatunji and His Group In Action No. 2 
(Philips PL 13413)
[A] Alaja Jinadu / Alhaji Mustafa Dabiri / Late Ramoni Alao / Yekini Aridegbe / Egbe Irepolodun (Ibadan)
[B] Salawu Adejola / Mutairu Lemboye / Alhaji Badiru Sodunke / Badiru Amole Ajisegiri / Egbe Oredegbe (Egba)

Yusufu Olatunji and His Group In Action Vol. 3 
(Philips PL 13414)
[A] Tijani Akinyele / Alimi Okerayi / Yusufu Olatunji / Sule Apena / Alhaja Raliatu Adeyemi
[B] Busari Salami (Baba Jebba) / Abudu Amodemaja / Rafiu Amoo (Nijaiye) / Alafia Boys (Eko) / Muniratu Laro

Yusufu Olatunji and His Group In Action Vol. 4 
(10" LP, Philips PL 13422)(CD; Premier Music [Lagos] PLCD 003 [as Vol.4 Asa Mba Eiyele Sere])
[A] Kuye Dada / Alhaji Rasaki Sanusi / Busura Babaosa / Alhaji Ramoni Salami / Lamidi Durowoju
[B] Asa Mba Eiyele Sere / Shewu / Alhaji Raufu Adeola / Liadi Shomuyiwa / Egbe Ifelodun Adeoyo (Ibadan)

Yusuf Olatunji and His Sakara Group Vol. 5 Beriwa Ekiwa 
(LP; unknown)(CD; Zareco [Lagos] ORSL 1302 [as Vol.5 Ilu T'ao Moba])(CD; Olatunji [Lagos] no number)
Alhaji Raufu Salawu / Alhaji Ayinde Adenekan / Beriwa Ekiwa / Boti Sefun Mi / Late Shittu Olasimbo / Late J.F. Olasimbo / Abimbola Gbolade / Alhaji Adeleke Dada / Idayatu Sowami / Egbe Oredegbe (Agege)

1970
Yusufu Olatunji and His Group In Action
Vol. 6 (Philips PL 6386007)(CD; Premier Music [Lagos] PLCD 009 [as Vol. 6 Oye Kani Fura])
[A] Nofiu Lashoju / Datemi Lare / O Ye Kani Fura / Egbe Fourteen Members / Egbe Ifelodun Kenta
[B] Itoko Area / Chief Waidi Awoleshu / Adegoke Ajao / Egba Boys Society / R. Ayandeyi Akangbe

?
Yusufu Olatunji and His Group
Kasumu Sanni b/w Raimi Asuni (45; Badejo's Sound Studios BBAF 1022)

?
Yusufu Olatunji and His Group
Vol. 7 (Zareco ORSL 1301)(CD; Zareco [Lagos] ORSL 1301 [as Vol.7 E Ma F'ojowu Meji Dele])(CD; Olatunji [Lagos] no number [as Vol.7 Late Alimi Orerayi])
[A] Memudu Amoo Abolade / Alhaji Olanrewaju Oseni / Oremeji (Ijebu-Ode) / Late Alimi Orerayi / R. P. Salami
[B] Lasisi Adelanwa / Falila Abeke / Nbamodi Ese (Lasisi Omolayemi) / Egbe Social (Eko) / Egbe Oba Idimu

?
Yusufu Olatunji and His Group
Vol. 8 Toba Oluwa Ni Yio Se (Zareco ORSL ??)(CD; Premier Music [Lagos] PLCD 024)
Alhaji M. Tolani / Sufianu Ishola Aregbe / Egbe Irawo Egba (Eko) / Moshudi Bello / Tijani Alalubarika / Ganiyu Ajimobi (Alhaji) / Kubura Abike Adebisi (Cash Woman) / Alhaji Bello Agunbiade / Alhaji Y. Ashiyenbi / Egbe Ifenirepo (Odi-Olowo)

1971
Yusufu Olatunji and His Group In Action
Vol. 9 (10" LP, Badejo's Sound Studio BBA 3004R; Zareco ORSR1303)
[A] T. Ayinde Shonibare / Shittu Olafuyi / Busari Akiyo / Buraimoh Ogunmefun / Soredegbe(Iffo)
[B] Lamide Adedibu / Buraimoh Oyedele / Comfort Seriki / Alhaji Raufu Akiode / Egbe Oredegbe (Saro)

?
Yusufu Olatunji and His Group In Action
Vol. 10 (Philips / Phonogram PL 6386022)(CD; Premier Music [Lagos] PLCD 021[as Vol.10 Otegbola])(CD; Zareco [Lagos] no number [as Vol.10 Ka Tun 'Ra Mu])
[A] Mudasiru Otegbola / Titilayo Ejire / Raimi Balogun / Sikiru Balogun / Alafia Boys
[B] Wahabi Shekoni / Nurudeen Adedeji / Abudu Okedara / Late Ramoni Sanni / Egbe Ifelodun Ikereku

?
Yusuf Olatunji (Baba Legba) & His Sakara Group
Vol. 12 Iranse Lowo Je (LP; unknown)(CD; Zareco [Lagos] no number)
Raimi Ayinla Mogaji / Lamina Alabede / James Soyoye / Alaru Durowoju / Alaru Durowoju / Egbe Osupa (Egba) / Amidu Ojedara / Alhaji Lamidi Shoge / Ilupeju Adatan / Alhaji Raji Akanji / Oredegbe Mushin

?
Yusuf Olatunji (Baba Legba) & His Sakara Group
Vol. 13 Asiko Wa Ni (LP; unknown)(CD; Zareco [Lagos] no number)
Alimi Sanusi / Chief Olorun Tele / Alhaji Sufianu Akande / Egbe Yusuf Olatunji / Bakare Shonde / Alade Okewole / Wosilatu Ologundudu / Alhaji Mustafa Bakare / Tijani Lemomu / Egbe Fowosere
?yusufu Olatunji and His Group
Vol. 14 (Zareco ORSL 1701)(CD; Zareco [Lagos] no number [as Vol.14 Late Badejo Okusanya])
[A] Late Badejo Okusanya / Lasisi Karaole
[B] Oba Alake of Egba Land / Yusufu Olatunji / Amuda Obelawo / Egbe Onifaji Eko

1973
Yusufu Olatunji and His Group
Vol. 15 (Philips / Phonogram PL 6361031)(CD; Premier Music [Lagos] PLCD 018[as Vol.15 Onitire])(CD; Zareco [Lagos] no number [as Vol.15 Oni 'Tire])
[A] Jimoh Olojo (Itire) / Sunmonu Akanbi Olori / Karimu Olota / Nuru Alowonle / Egbe Ifelajulo (Ijemo)
[B] Wahabi Ayinla Adetoun / Aminu Alamu Bello / Jimoh Ishola Amodu / Alhaji Ganiyu Elekuro / Egbe Obaniba Siri

1973
Yusufu Olatunji and His Group
Vol. 16 (Zareco ORSL 1703)(CD; Zareco [Lagos] no number [as Vol.16 Ojise Nla])
[A] Late Lasisi Omo Layemi / Muraina Clundegun / Orin Faji / Jarinatu Seriki / Egbe Ifelodun (Ilupeju)
[B] Oloye Egba / Alhaji Amuda Balogun / Alhaji Ganiyu Latunde / J. K. O. T. / Egbe Ajigbotoluwa (Ibadan)

?
Yusufu Olatunji and His Group
Vol. 17 (Philips / Phonogram PL 6361050)(CD; Premier Music [Lagos] PLCD 010 [as Vol.17 Yegede])
[A] Orin Yusufu Olatunji / Kuburatu Adebisi Edioseri / Egba Ilupeju (Kemta)
[B] Sule Esinlokun / Awon Oba Eko /Basiratu Salawe Akanni /Sherifatu Asake / Late Sidi Ereko.

1974
Yusufu Olatunji and His Sakara Group
Vol. 18 (Zareco ORSL 1706)
[A] Alhaji Akanbi Awolesu / S. A. Sunmonu / Late Suara (Abusi Ibadan) / Oti Oyinbo
[B] Governor Rotimi / Abudu Sanni Omo-Aje / Salawu Amoo Arikuyeri / Alhaja Sariatu Jaiyeoba / Egbe Olowolagba (Gbagura)

?
Yusufu Olatunji and His Group In Action
Vol. 19 (Philips / Phonogram PL 6361066)(CD; Premier Music [Lagos] PLCD 005 [as Vol.19 Se Eni Kosi, Omo Yin Nyo])
[A] Ayinde S. Kenkenke / Jinadu Esho (Ifo) / Raufu Are Atan Nagbowo / Salaru Adeywmi / Egbe Liberty (Eko)
[B] Amusa Adenekan / Rashidi Adogbonjeun / Yusufu And His Group / Eji Gbadero / Egbe Fesojaiye

?
Yusufu Olatunji and His Group
Vol. 20 (Zareco ORSL 1708)(CD; Zareco [Lagos] ORSL 1708 [as Vol.20 Omo T'i O Gba Eko Ile])
[A] Chief Lasisi Oseni / Alhaji Salisu Majek / Rasaki Keshiro / Ramoni Alabi Olayiwola / Ero Wo O Ero Wo / Egbe Ifelodun
[B] A Se'ba K'A To Sere / Eje Ka Sere Han Won / Alhaji Rafiu Ajakaku (Ibadan) / Egbe Irepolodun (Egba)

?
Yusufu Olatunji and His Group (Sakara)
Vol. 21 (Philips / Phonogram PL 6361089)(CD; Premier Music [Lagos] PLCD 001 [as Vol.21 Ijimere Sogigun])(CD; Zareco [Lagos] Z.O.N 6361089 [as Vol.21 Ijimere Sogigun])
[A] Lamidi Akinola / Asani Komolafe / Falilatu Shoga / Alhaja Nofisatu Agbeke / Egbe Ifelodun (Egba)
[B] Sogigun / Jimoh Oni / Alhaji Raufu Adisa / Egbe Owoseni (Imo)

1975
Yusufu Olatunji and His Group
Vol. 22 (Zareco ORSL 1711)(CD; Olatunji [Lagos] CMP008 [as Vol.22 Iwa])
[A] IWA / Shewu Bakare / Alhaja Musili Ashake / Egbe Ajisafe Oshogbo
[B] Lamina Ojugbele / Alhaji Abasi Olisa / Fatai Are-Ago / Ailara Amodemaja / Egbe Ifelodun (Oke-Bode)

?
Yusuf Olatunji & His Sakara Group
Vol. 23 Olowo Lagba (LP; unknown)(CD; Premier Music PLCD 004)(CD; Zareco [Lagos] no number)
Olowo Lagba / Fasasi Olowobuso / Alhaji Salimonu Lawal / Egbe Osupa Egba / Alhaji Ishatu Korodo / Olufunmilayo Abiodun / Omo Ogun Oloko (Oshodi) / Egbe Olo Member (Ibadan) / Buraimo Dan Boy (Ilorin)

1976
Yusufu Olatunji and His Group
Vol. 24 (Zareco ORSL 1717)(CD; Olatunji [Lagos] no number [as Vol.24 Oba Oluwa Loni Dede])
[A] Olorun Oba L'o Ni Dede / Mo Ranti Baba Kan / Lati Olasimbo / Egbe Iwajowa (Ijebu-Ode) / Alhaji Kasumu Ajibola
[B] S. Abeni / Ambali Akanni Salawu / Egbe Oredegbe (Isale Offin)

1976
Yusufu Olatunji and His Group
Vol. 25 (Philips / Phonogram PL 6361160)(CD; Premier Music [Lagos] PLCD 019[as Vol.25 Kafi Ara Wa Sokan])(CD; Zareco [Lagos] no number [as Vol.25 Oku Ano Konira])
[A] Adeleke Ashata / Mukadasi Aregbe / Salamotu Abiosoye Oliyide
[B] Alhaji Isiaka Kaka / Rafiu Adigun / Alhaji Bakare Adenle / Egbe Ifelodun Oatunji (Egba)

1977
Yusufu Olatunji and His Group
Vol. 26 (Zareco ORSL 1721)(CD; Zareco [Lagos] ORSL 1721 [as Vol.26 Ogun State])
[A] Ogun State / Late Murtala Muhammed / Alhaji Oloruntele Olukoya / Egbe Irepolodun (Ibadan)
[B] Igba Ta Ba Fi Winka / Akanju Wowo / Fasasi Kasumu / Raufu Arogundade / Egbe Oredegbe (Eko)

1977
Yusufu Olatunji and His Group
Vol. 27 (Philips / Phonogram PL 6361256)(CD; Premier Music [Lagos] PLCD 006 [as Vol.27 Orin Tokotaya])(CD; Zareco [Lagos] no number [as Vol.27 Oro Loko Laya])
[A] Alhaji Adetunji Adenekan / Alhaja Lati Ladejobi / Sinotu Abeke / Egbe Egba Parapo (Oshodi)
[B] Orin Tokotaya / Orin Asiko / Rasaki Adelakun / Egbe Faripo (Egba) / Egbe Irepolodun (Egba)

?
Yusufu Olatunji and His Group In Action
Vol. 28 (Zareco ORSL 1725)(CD; Zareco [Lagos] no number [as Vol.27 Ef' Omo Fun Alapata])
[A] Alhaji Rasidi Shoyoye / Alhaji Lasisi Akinshola / Ramoni Shanusi / Wosilatu Ologundudu
[B] Alhaji Yinusa Akanbi (Otta) / Kilani - Babanla / Alhaja - Wosilatu - Oguntade

1978
Yusufu Olatunji and His Sakara Group
Vol. 29 (Philips / Phonogram PL 6361335)(CD; Zareco [Lagos] no number [as Vol.29 Ilu Osugbo])
[A] Surakatu Akinbola / Alhaji Yekini Ajala / Egbe Owo Otta
[B] Lawrence Aina / Aileru Sodimu / Rasy Musitafa / Egbe Obanibashiri Kemta

1978
Yusufu Olatunji and His Sakara Group
Vol. 30 (Zareco ORSL 1729)
[A] Alhaji Samusi Ayorinde / Alhaji Musitafa Oyeleke / Sufianu Ogunwolu / Raufu Ajani Raji
[B] Alhaji Muraina Ajadi / Jimo Ishola Amodu / Nofisatu Iya Iebeji / Egbe Irepudun Ibadan

?
Yusufu Olatunji and His Group
Vol. 32 (Zareco ORSL 1731)
[A] Iba Abibu - Oluwa / Alhaji Akinpelu / Alhaji Salabiu Ladejobi / Egbe Binukonu Iwo
[B] Ibi Agbagbe Fowo - Tisi / Sidikatu - Sogbamu / Alhaji Sule - Shittu / Egbe Alafia Boys Egba

1980
Yusufu Olatunji and His Sakara Group
Vol. 33 (Zareco/Fontana FTLP 107)(CD; Premier Music [Lagos] PLCD 024[as Vol.33 Adegbenro])
[A] Late Akhaji Adegbenro / Bakare Ajani Olagunju / Egbe Fesojaiye (Adatani)
[B] Kasunmu Isola Sanni / Sabitiyu Adunni / Egbe Anjuwon (Itoko)

1981
Late Yusufu Olatunji and His Sakara Group
Vol. 35 (Zareco ORSL 1737)(CD; Zareco [Lagos] ORSL 1737 [as Vol.35 Oloye Faji])
[A] Alhaji Raufu Kube-Kube / Alhaji Jimo Idowu / Rabiatu Ayoka (Oloye Faji of Lagos) / Mukaila Balogun / Egbe Ifelodun-Fiditi
[B] Lasisi Ishola Fajebe / Mutalubi Dami / Alhaji Onilegbale / Egbe Ifelodun Odi - Olowo

?
Late Yusufu Olatunji (Baba L'egba) and His Sakara Group
Vol. 36 Ore Marun (Zareco ORSL ??)(CD; Premier Music [Lagos] PLCD 025)
Alhaji Olatinwa Aderemi  / Alhaji Akande Falahan / Alhaji Ishau Lawal / Alhaji Shittu Adeyemi / Alhaji Busari Akano / Oredegbe Ita-Faji (Eko) / Alhaji Badiru Alubarikaloju / Emide Bello / Egbe Ifelodun Fowosere (Egba)

1981-2
Yusufu Olatunji and His Sakara Group
Vol. 37 (Zareco ORSL 1739)(CD; Zareco [Lagos] ORSL 1737 [as Vol.37 Mapada Leyin Mi Oba Oluwa])
[A] Chief Adeniyi Idowu / Jinadu Ogunbayo / Awon Omo Lefude / Egbe Osupa Egba Obinrin
[B] Mapada Lehin Mi Oluwa / Alhaji Ashiru Olona / Alhaji R. P. Salami / Egbe Ajisafe (Eko) Mushin

1987
Yusufu Olatunji and His Sakara Group
Baba O 5 (Zareco ORSL 1742)
[A] Waidi Orelope / Larimu Seriki / Rabiu Shodunke / Shitu Dokunmu
[B] K. Dawodu / Jimoh Asuni / Jimo Subulade / Alhaji Lemboye / James Kodaolu / Oredegbe Kaduna

?
Yusufu Olatunji (Baba Legba) & His Sakara Group
Alara Morire (LP; unknown)(CD; Zareco [Lagos] no number)
Alara Morire / Busari Salami / Rasidi Ayandeyi / Chief Kosebinu (Sagua Of Ilugun) / S.B. Bakare / Raji Asindemade / Alhaji Aremu Kolapo / Surakatu Rosiji / Fasasi Bakare / Abadatu L.L.B

?
Yusufu Olatunji (Baba Legba) & His Sakara Group
Agbalagba To'nta Roba F'eye (LP; unknown)(CD; Zareco [Lagos] no number)
Waidi Orelope / Karimu Seriki / Rabiu Shodunke / Shitu Dokunmu / Egbe Unity / K. Dawodu / Jimoh Asuni / Jimoh Subulade / Alhaji Lemboye / James kodaolu / Oredegbe Kaduna

1993
Yusufu Olatunji
Legend Vol. 2 (Premier Music PLMC 002 )
[A] Yusuf Oyokun / Sikiratu Shobayo / Asani Oloriebi / Alhaji Tijani Ariledesi/Egbe Binukonu / Rasaki Sanusi/raji bosa orire/adelabu adegoke
[B] Surakatu Amodu / Egbe Ajisafe / Lamidi Shoge / Oroke Loni Niyen / Jimoh Olori Ebi / Abadatu Amoke / Joseph Balogun

2001
Yusuf Olatunji Baba L'egba and His Sakara Group
The Living Songs Of The Legend Series 1 (CD; no label AG 002)
Ajagbe ejo /Asa Mba Eiyele Sere / Orin Toko Taya / Baba In The 60's

2001
Yusuf Olatunji Baba L'egba and His Sakara Group
The Living Songs Of The Legend Series 3 (CD; no label AG 003)
Orin Yusuf Olatunji / Awon Oba Eko / Alhaji Adetunji Adenekan

?
Yusufu Olatunji and His Group
Premier Legend (Premier Music PLMC 004 )
[A] Jimoh Olojo (Itire) / Sunmonu Akanbi Olori / Karimu Olota / Nuru Alowonie / Egbe Ifelajulo (Ijemo)
[B] Wabi Ayinla Adeotun / Aminu Alamu Bello / Jimoh Ishola Amodu / Alhaji Ganiyu Elekuro / Egbe Obanibasiri Eko

?
Yusufu Olatunji and His Group
Premier Legend (Premier Music PLMC 006 )
[A] Tijani Akinyele / Alimi Okerayi / Yusufu Olatunji / Sule Apena / Lahaja Raliatu Adeyemi
[B] Busari Salami (Baba Jebba) / Abudu Amodemaja / Rafiu Amoo (Nijaiye) / Alafia Boys (Eko) / Muniratu Laro

?
Late Pa Yusufu Olatunji (Baba L'egba)
The Evergreen Sakara Hit Collections Series 1 (CD; Premier Music no number)
Fasasi Bakare / Egbe Unity/ Adeniran Adegboyega / Mojisola Ologunebi / Rabiu Sodunke / Shittu Dokunmi / Surukatu Fadipe / Oredegbe Kaduna / Yusufu Oyekun / Sikiratu Shobayo / Asani Oloriebi / Alhaji Tijani Ariledesi / Waidi Orelope / Karimu Seriki / 
Raji bosa Mustafa orire / Ramoni Ogunyomi / Lasisi Abiola / Jimoh Seriki

?
Late Pa Yusufu Olatunji (Baba L'egba)
The Evergreen Sakara Hit Collections Series 2 (CD; Premier Music no number)
Bolowo Bate / Ganiyu Ladeyinde / Yekini Akintoye / Egbe Iwajowa (Ijebu Ode) / Surukatu Eki / Jimoh Gbensola / Raufu Adegbite / Ajagbe Imenirepo / Nofiu Lashoju / Da Temi Lare / O Ye Kani Fura / Egbe Fourteen Members / Egbe Ifelodun Kenta / Ijoko Area / Chief Waidi Awoleshu / Adegoke Ajao / Egbe Boys Society / R. Ayandeji Akangbe / Alhaja Muniratu Abeo / Samsudeen Bankole / Abraham Idowu

?
Late Yusufu Olatunji (Baba L'egba) and His Sakara Group
Orin Faaji (CD; Premier Music [Lagos] PLCD 017)
Faji Song / Jimoh Seriki / Tesimili Kushimo / Lamidi Shoge / George Bammeke / Egbe Obanibashiri / Rasaki Sanusi / Shitu Arowokoko / Chief Lamidi Ashiwaju / Raufu Adeola / Jimo Ologun Ebi / Abadatu Amoke

References

Nigerian male musicians
Yoruba musicians
1905 births
1978 deaths
Nigerian drummers
Nigerian former Christians
Nigerian Muslims
Converts to Islam from Christianity
20th-century Nigerian musicians
20th-century drummers
20th-century male musicians